Drakkar Productions is a French record label that has released many recordings of black metal bands throughout the world, on CD, cassette and vinyl. They have usually limited the prints to 1,000 copies or less, but some have been known to vary. The label is now notorious for its Les Légions Noires releases, as well as other black metal bands that are known throughout the world.

Overview
Drakkar Productions started out in 1994 when Noktu, a friend of Meyhna'ch, offered to release some Mütiilation material, along with some other Les Légions Noires stuff. This was because no one else would release their material at the time, and the bands felt they wanted some official releases. Noktu soon after released his own band's material, Celestia, and followed by other acts.

Bands

Active Roster
 Anxiety
 Arghoslent
 Drama Noir
 Empty
 Celestia
 Goatreich 666
 Hiver Noir
 Imago Mortis
 Interfektor
 Myrkr
 Nåstrond
 Necrosadistic Goat Torture
 Sick
 Vassafor
 Vrolok

Past roster
 Abigail
 Alcest
 Amaka Hahina
 Black Funeral
 Deathspell Omega
 Grand Belial's Key
 Grima morstua
 Lucifugum
 Mütiilation
 Torgeist
 Vermeth
 Vlad Tepes
 Watain
Peste Noire

Catalogue

DK (cassettes)

DKCD (Compact Discs)

DKLP (Vinyl LPs)

DKMLP (10" Vinyl "Mini LP")

DKEP (7" Vinyl EPs)

References

External links
 Drakkar Productions website

French independent record labels
Record labels established in 1994
Black metal record labels
Death metal record labels